Robert William Edwards (born 1 January 1973 in Kendal, Westmorland) is a professional football manager and former player. He played for Football League One side Exeter City before retiring in May 2011, and is a Welsh international, being capped on four occasions. In May 2014, he was appointed the manager of Tranmere Rovers. He was sacked from the post in October 2014. In August 2019 Edwards was promoted from  Wales Under 17 coach to Wales Under 19 team coach

Playing career

Edwards, a defender, started his career as a trainee with Carlisle, playing in 56 first team games with the club. On 27 March 1991, Robert completed a £135,000 move to then Division Two side Bristol City.

In over eight seasons at Ashton Gate, Edwards made 266 appearances and earned his first cap for Wales. On 8 August 1999 Edwards moved on a free to then League One side Preston North End, where he played an important role in Preston's title victory, and promotion to the second tier. On 1 July 2004, Edwards moved to League One side Blackpool where he made 69 appearances before being released on a free at the end of the 2005–06 season by manager Simon Grayson. He scored once during his spell at Blackpool, in a 2–1 defeat to Sheffield Wednesday in August 2004.

After playing on trial with his first club Carlisle and also League Two side Rochdale, Edwards was snapped up by Conference National side Exeter City. After signing for the Grecians in 2006, he established himself as a first team regular in the heart of the defence for Exeter City and in December 2007, City manager Paul Tisdale appointed Rob as player-coach at Exeter: coaching the reserves, while still being a member of the first team. In fact, he was the only member of the squad to start in all 46 matches of Exeter's 2007–08 campaign. That season culminated in Edwards scoring the winning goal at Wembley on 18 May 2008 in Exeter's 2008 Conference National play-off Final win over Cambridge United securing the club's return to the Football League.

He retired from professional football in May 2011.

Managerial career

After retiring, Edwards worked as first team coach for Exeter City. 
On 13 May 2014 Edwards quit as assistant manager of Exeter City.
On 27 May 2014, he was appointed as the new manager of Tranmere Rovers. Edwards was sacked from his job as manager on 13 October 2014.

In February 2015 Edwards, who the previous December had been appointed as assistant to Paul Buckle at Cheltenham Town, left the club (along with Buckle) by mutual consent.

In August 2019 Edwards was promoted from  Wales Under 17 coach to Wales Under 19 team coach.

Managerial statistics

References

External links

1973 births
Living people
Sportspeople from Kendal
Footballers from Cumbria
Welsh footballers
Wales youth international footballers
Wales under-21 international footballers
Wales B international footballers
Wales international footballers
Association football defenders
Association football utility players
Carlisle United F.C. players
Bristol City F.C. players
Preston North End F.C. players
Blackpool F.C. players
Exeter City F.C. players
Welsh football managers
Tranmere Rovers F.C. managers
English Football League managers
Exeter City F.C. non-playing staff
Cheltenham Town F.C. non-playing staff
Southampton F.C. non-playing staff